SLP Engineering, also known as Sembmarine SLP, is a construction company in Lowestoft that builds gas platforms for the North Sea and offshore industry.

History
Sea & Land Pipe Lines Ltd was founded on 7 March 1967. SLP Engineering was based in London. In the company was Sea and Land Pipelines (Production). Another division was SLP Fabricating Engineers.

On 23 September 2009, the company was visited by the Princess Royal. In November 2009, the company entered administration; at the time the company employed around 900 people. It was owned by Smulders of the Netherlands, then bought by SembCorp Marine in October 2012 for £2.5m.

Structure
It is a subsidiary of SembCorp Marine, an EPC constructor. The site in Lowestoft is situated off the A12 in the Port of Lowestoft.

See also
 Consafe Engineering of Scotland, builds accommodation modules for North Sea platforms

References

External links
 SLP Engineering

North Sea energy
Steel companies of the United Kingdom
Structural steel
Companies based in Suffolk
Lowestoft
Manufacturing companies established in 1967
Non-renewable resource companies established in 1967
British companies established in 1967